Tak Football Club is a Thai semi professional football club based in Tak Province. They currently play in Thai Division 2 League Northern Region.

Timeline

History of events of Tak Football Club

Stadium and locations

Season By Season Record

Players

Current squad

External links 
 Official Website of Tak FC
 Official Facebookpage of Tak FC

Association football clubs established in 2009
Football clubs in Thailand
Sport in Tak province
2009 establishments in Thailand